Grand Princess Bokguk (d. 8 November 1319) was a Mongolian imperial family member who became a Korean queen consort as the first wife of King Chungsuk of Goryeo. Her personal name was Borjigin Yilianzhenbala. In 1316, she married into a different family but she died within three years.

Life
When she came to Goryeo in the same year with her marriage in 1316, it was said that she was very jealous of Virtuous Consort Hong due to Hong's closeness with the King. As a result, the Princess did not have a good relationship with the King and often was beaten, which made her bleed from her nose. Three years later, she died and received her Posthumous name as Princess Jeonghwa (정화공주, 靖和公主).

Two years later, in 1321, Yi Sang-ji (이상지) was sent from Jungseoseong, Yuan dynasty to investigate the Princess's death. At this time, the Princess's servant and some witnesses said:
"Last August, when King Chungsuk and Consort Hong secretly slept together, the Princess eventually became jealous [of them] making her [receive beatings from] the King. This accident [happened often] until sometimes the Princess [bled from] her nose because of this."
(작년 8월 충숙왕과 덕비가 몰래 동침하자 공주가 질투하여 왕이 공주를 구타하였으며, 이때 공주가 코피를 흘렸다. 9월에도 묘련사에 가서 왕이 공주를 구타하는 것을 어신부개 등이 말렸다).
For checking the other truth, the Yuans took all of the witnesses.  Later, the Goryeo officials (Baek Won-hang (백원항) and Bak Hyo-su (박효수)) claimed their innocence and the investigation narrowly ended. For honour the Princess, the Yuan dynasty gave her the better title as Grand Princess of Bok State (복국장공주, 濮國長公主) in 1343. Meanwhile, she and Chungsuk did not have any issue.

See also
Goryeo under Mongol rule

References

복국장공주 on Encykorea .
복국장공주 on Doosan Encyclopedia .

Year of birth unknown
1319 deaths
Mongol consorts of the Goryeo Dynasty
Korean queens consort
Chinese princesses
14th-century Korean women
14th-century Chinese women
14th-century Chinese people
14th-century Mongolian women